was a Japanese politician and diplomat who served as the Minister for Foreign Affairs for three terms. He is believed to have originated the concept of the Greater East Asia Co-Prosperity Sphere.

Biography 
Arita was born on the island of Sado in Niigata Prefecture. He joined the Ministry of Foreign Affairs after graduation in 1909 from the Law School of Tokyo Imperial University, and established himself as an expert on Asian affairs. Arita was on the Japanese delegation to the Versailles Peace Treaty Conference of 1919, and in his early career also was stationed at the Japanese consulates in Mukden and in Honolulu. He served as Japanese ambassador to Austria in 1930. He returned to Japan to briefly serve as Vice Foreign Minister in 1932, but returned to Europe in 1933 as Japanese ambassador to Belgium.

Arita became Foreign Minister under the cabinet of Prime Minister Kōki Hirota in 1936, and continued to serve in that post under the administrations of Fumimaro Konoe and Kiichirō Hiranuma and Mitsumasa Yonai. He was also a member of the House of Peers in the Diet of Japan from 1938.

Arita was an opponent of the Tripartite Pact, and continually pushed for better relations with the United States. However, with the increasing power and influence of the military in Japanese politics, he was repeatedly forced to make compromises.

After the end of the war, Arita successfully ran for a seat in the House of Representatives in 1953. He attempted to run for the office of Governor of Tokyo in 1955 and again in 1959, but lost both elections. He died in 1965, and his grave is at the Tama Cemetery in Fuchū, Tokyo.

Private affairs 
Arita was a well-known political figure and his adultery with the hostess of a Ginza nightclub was publicized by the novel  by Yukio Mishima. After its publication in 1960, Arita sued Mishima for invasion of privacy. The Tokyo District Court ruled in favor of Arita in 1963, marking the first time the right to privacy of a public figure had been recognized by a Japanese court.

References

Books

External links

 
 

1884 births
1965 deaths
People from Sado, Niigata
Members of the House of Representatives (Japan)
Foreign ministers of Japan
Ambassadors of Japan to Austria
Japanese people of World War II
University of Tokyo alumni
Tokyo gubernatorial candidates
Ambassadors of Japan to Belgium